First Baptist Church (also known as Glad Tidings Baptist Church; Flagstaff Christian Fellowship) is a historic Conservative Baptist church at 123 S. Beaver Street in Flagstaff, Arizona, United States.

It was built in 1939 and added to the National Register in 1991.

References

External links

 
 

Baptist churches in Arizona
Churches on the National Register of Historic Places in Arizona
Gothic Revival church buildings in Arizona
Churches completed in 1939
National Register of Historic Places in Flagstaff, Arizona
Churches in Coconino County, Arizona